Parry Sound Harbour Water Aerodrome  is located adjacent to Parry Sound, Ontario, Canada.

See also
 List of airports in the Parry Sound area

References

Registered aerodromes in Parry Sound District
Transport in Parry Sound District
Transport in Parry Sound, Ontario
Seaplane bases in Ontario